Bennettville is an unincorporated community in Hazelton Township, Aitkin County, Minnesota, United States. The community is located between Garrison and Aitkin along U.S. Highway 169 near the junction with 270th Street and Aitkin County Road 11, Tame Fish Lake Road.

References

Unincorporated communities in Aitkin County, Minnesota
Unincorporated communities in Minnesota